Turza Mała may refer to the following places:
Turza Mała, Mława County in Masovian Voivodeship (east-central Poland)
Turza Mała, Płock County in Masovian Voivodeship (east-central Poland)
Turza Mała, Warmian-Masurian Voivodeship (north Poland)